SS-Oberst-Gruppenführer was (from 1942 to 1945) the highest commissioned rank in the Schutzstaffel (SS), with the exception of Reichsführer-SS, which became a commissioned rank when held by SS commander Heinrich Himmler. The rank is translated as "highest group leader" and alternatively as "colonel group leader". The rank was correctly spelled Oberst-Gruppenführer to avoid confusion with the more junior rank of Obergruppenführer.

Overview 
Oberst-Gruppenführer was considered the equivalent of a colonel general (Generaloberst) in the German Army, which is generally seen as the equivalent of a four-star general or army general in other armed forces.

The rank of Oberst-Gruppenführer was first proposed in early 1942 as a possible future rank for Waffen-SS commanders who might be promoted to command Army Groups.  The Heer leadership immediately opposed the creation of an SS-Colonel General rank, since army commanders felt that no SS general should hold such a large amount of authority and that SS combat commands should be restricted to the Corps and Division level.  The idea of SS Armies and Army Groups was something few wished to see develop – two SS Armies would eventually be established, (the 6th and the 11th SS Armies).  No SS Army Groups were ever created.

Promotion history 

In April 1942, on Adolf Hitler's personal authority, the rank of SS- was first bestowed. The appointment was to Nazi Party treasurer and RZM chief Franz Xaver Schwarz. On the same day orders were issued for a dual promotion within the Ordnungspolizei, making Kurt Daluege a Generaloberst der Polizei at the same time. Daluege's rank was the only police promotion to this rank.

The last two of the four Oberst-Gruppenführer promotions were made in 1944, this time to Waffen-SS generals. Dietrich's date of rank was back-dated to 1942, making him the most senior officer of the Waffen-SS. The final seniority list was as follows:

 Franz Xaver Schwarz, 20 April 1942 (... der Allgemeinen SS)
 Josef "Sepp" Dietrich, 20 April 1942  (... und Panzer-Generaloberst der Waffen-SS)
 Kurt Daluege, 20 April 1942 (... und Generaloberst der Polizei)
 Paul Hausser, 1 August 1944 (... und Generaloberst der Waffen-SS)

Franz Xaver Schwarz, who held Ehrenführer (honorary leader), was the only holder of the rank who was not granted equivalent police or Waffen-SS rank.  The Oberst-Gruppenführer rank was worn on the field-grey Waffen-SS tunic, the grey SS service tunic, or in Daluege's case the German police uniform.  There are no photographic records of the insignia ever being worn on the black ceremonial uniform, which had largely fallen into disuse by the time the rank was created.

In 1944, Himmler offered to appoint Albert Speer to the honorary rank of Oberst-Gruppenführer. Speer declined, not wishing to formally be subordinate to Himmler. Himmler's successor, Karl Hanke, never held the rank of Oberst-Gruppenführer, but was appointed Reichsführer-SS from the lower grade of Obergruppenführer. Hans-Adolf Prützmann claimed to have been promoted to the rank in April 1945 by personal decree of Adolf Hitler; Prützmann's claim is not supported by either documentary or photographic evidence, leading most history texts to list his final rank as Obergruppenführer.

See also 
Corps colours (Waffen-SS)
List SS-Oberst-Gruppenführer
Ranks and insignia of the Waffen-SS

Notes

References

Citations

Bibliography

 
 
 
 
 
 
 
 SS-service records of Kurt Daluege, Paul Hausser, and Sepp Dietrich: National Archives and Records Administration, College Park, Maryland.

 
SS ranks
Nazi paramilitary ranks
German words and phrases
Four-star officers of Nazi Germany
Lists of generals